Wiatrowiec  is a village in the administrative district of Gmina Sępopol, within Bartoszyce County, Warmian-Masurian Voivodeship, in northern Poland, close to the border with the Kaliningrad Oblast of Russia.

Before 1945 the area belonged to Germany as part of Landkreis Bartenstein in the Province of East Prussia.

References

Wiatrowiec